Japanese football in 1987

Japan Soccer League

Division 1

Division 2

First stage

East

West

Second stage

Promotion Group

Relegation Group

East

West

9th-16th Places Playoff

Japanese Regional Leagues

Emperor's Cup

Japan Soccer League Cup

National team (Men)

Results

Players statistics

National team (Women)

Results

Players statistics

External links

 
Seasons in Japanese football